Roman Pisarski (23 March 1912 – 10 July 1969) was a writer, children's and young adult literature author, and teacher. He had graduated Polish studies at the Jagiellonian University, Kraków, Poland. He is the best known from his 1967 children's book O psie, który jeździł koleją, that was a fictionalised story based on the life of dog Lampo, who become famous for his rail journeys across Italy. The book had become the mandatory reading in the primary schools in Poland.

Works

Novels 
 Wakacje w zoo

Short stories 
 Sztuczny człowiek
 O psie, który jeździł koleją
 Petros pelikan
 Die Zeitkupplung (published in Die gelbe Lokomotive anthology)

Poem stories 
 Podróże małe i duże
 Opowieść o toruńskim pierniku
 Opowieść o Lajkoniku
 Sklep zegarmistrza
 Gliniane kogutki
 Domy, zamki, pałace
 Jak się mieszka tu i tam
 Wyrwidąb i Waligóra
 W zaczarowanym sklepie
 Szczęśliwy dzień

Poems 
 Rzekła rzepa rzepakowi
 Kolorowa gramatyka
 Śmieszne historie
 Na łące i na płocie
 Na Wroniej ulicy
 Zielone serce
 W lesie
 Patrząc na pawia
 Rozmowa z lalkami
 Prima aprilis
 Weseli astronauci
 Port i morze

Theater plays 
 Piernikarze z Torunia

Others 
 Straż nad Odrą

References 

1912 births
1969 deaths
Polish children's writers
Writers from Ivano-Frankivsk
Jagiellonian University alumni